Paz Bash (born 28 June 1983) is an Israeli racing cyclist. She competed in the 2013 UCI women's road race in Florence.

Major results
Source: 

2011
 3rd Road race, National Road Championships
2012
 1st  Time trial, National Road Championships
2013
 National Road Championships
1st  Time trial
1st  Road race
2014
 National Road Championships
1st  Time trial
1st  Road race
 1st  Cross-country, National Mountain Bike Championships
2015
 National Road Championships
1st  Time trial
3rd Road race
 1st Gilboa Mountainbike
2016
 1st  Time trial, National Road Championships
2017
 National Road Championships
2nd Road race
3rd Time trial
2018
 National Road Championships
3rd Time trial
3rd Road race
2019
 National Road Championships
2nd Time trial
3rd Road race
 10th Tour of Arava

References

External links

1983 births
Living people
Israeli female cyclists
Place of birth missing (living people)
Cyclists at the 2015 European Games
European Games competitors for Israel